UFC 195: Lawler vs. Condit was a mixed martial arts event held on January 2, 2016, at the MGM Grand Garden Arena in Las Vegas, Nevada.

Background
The event was expected to feature a UFC Women's Bantamweight Championship bout between then-undefeated champion Ronda Rousey and Holly Holm, a former 18-time boxing world champion in three weight classes. However, the bout was moved to UFC 193 after a thumb injury to UFC Welterweight Champion Robbie Lawler forced him out of his title bout against Carlos Condit, a former WEC Welterweight Champion and former interim UFC Welterweight Champion. The Lawler/Condit pairing remained intact and headlined this event.

A welterweight bout between Sheldon Westcott and Edgar García, originally scheduled for UFC Fight Night: Namajunas vs. VanZant was moved to this event.

A lightweight bout between Dustin Poirier and Joseph Duffy was originally booked as main event for UFC Fight Night: Holohan vs. Smolka. However, the bout was canceled on fight week due to Duffy sustaining a concussion during a sparring session. The fight was later rescheduled for this event.

Neil Magny was briefly scheduled to face Stephen Thompson at the event. However, on November 3, Magny was pulled from the pairing in favor of a matchup with Kelvin Gastelum at The Ultimate Fighter Latin America 2 Finale. Thompson was expected to remain on the card, but on December 13 it was announced that he was going to face former UFC Welterweight champion Johny Hendricks at UFC 196.

Russell Doane was briefly scheduled to face Michinori Tanaka at the event. However, Doane was pulled from the pairing for undisclosed reasons and was replaced by former Bellator Featherweight champion and one time UFC Bantamweight Championship challenger Joe Soto.

Erik Koch was expected to face Drew Dober at this event. However, on December 4, Koch was forced to pull out of the event due to injury and was replaced by Scott Holtzman.

Kelvin Gastelum was expected to face Kyle Noke at this event. However, on December 22, Gastelum was forced to pull out due to a wrist injury and was replaced by promotional newcomer Alex Morono.

On March 23, it was announced that Diego Brandão tested positive for marijuana metabolites and was issued a temporary suspension by the Nevada State Athletic Commission (NSAC). He was eventually suspended on May 19 for a period of nine months by USADA, retroactive to the date of the fight.

Results

Bonus awards
The following fighters were awarded $50,000 bonuses:
Fight of the Night: Robbie Lawler vs. Carlos Condit
Performance of the Night: Stipe Miocic and Michael McDonald

Reported payout
The following is the reported payout to the fighters as reported to the Nevada State Athletic Commission. It does not include sponsor money and also does not include the UFC's traditional "fight night" bonuses.
 Robbie Lawler: $500,000 (no win bonus) def. Carlos Condit: $350,000
 Stipe Miocic: $120,000 (includes $60,000 win bonus) def. Andrei Arlovski: $250,000
 Albert Tumenov: $40,000 (includes $20,000 win bonus) def. Lorenz Larkin: $36,000
 Brian Ortega: $24,000 (includes $12,000 win bonus) def. Diego Brandão: $36,000
 Abel Trujillo: $40,000 (includes $20,000 win bonus) def. Tony Sims: $12,000
 Michael McDonald: $40,000 (includes $20,000 win bonus) def. Masanori Kanehara: $14,000
 Alex Morono: $24,000 (includes $12,000 win bonus) def. Kyle Noke: $26,000
 Justine Kish: $20,000 (includes $10,000 win bonus) def. Nina Ansaroff: $10,000
 Drew Dober: $26,000 (includes $13,000 win bonus) def. Scott Holtzman: $12,000
 Dustin Poirier: $84,000 (includes $42,000 win bonus) def. Joseph Duffy: $20,000
 Michinori Tanaka: $24,000 (includes $12,000 win bonus) def. Joe Soto: $20,000
 Shelden Westcott: $20,000 (includes $10,000 win bonus) def. Edgar Garcia: $10,000

See also

List of UFC events
2016 in UFC

References

Ultimate Fighting Championship events
2016 in mixed martial arts
Mixed martial arts in Las Vegas
2016 in sports in Nevada
MGM Grand Garden Arena
January 2016 sports events in the United States